Flers-sur-Noye (literally Flers on Noye) is a commune in the Somme department in Hauts-de-France in northern France.

Geography

Population

See also
Communes of the Somme department

References

External links

 Flers sur Noye 

Communes of Somme (department)